Kisbér is a district in south-western part of Komárom-Esztergom County. Kisbér is also the name of the town where the district seat is found. The district is located in the Central Transdanubia Statistical Region.

Geography 
Kisbér District borders with Komárom District to the north, Oroszlány District to the east, Mór District (Fejér County) to the southeast, Zirc District (Veszprém County) to the southwest, Pannonhalma District and Győr District (Győr-Moson-Sopron County) to the west. The number of the inhabited places in Kisbér District is 17.

Settlements 
The district has 1 town and 17 villages, listed with population, as of 1 January 2013:

Demographics

In 2011, it had a population of 20,284 and the population density was 40/km2.

Ethnicity
Besides the Hungarian majority, the main minorities are the Roma (approx. 350) and German (200).

Total population (2011 census): 20,284
Ethnic groups (2011 census): Identified themselves: 18,120 persons:
Hungarians: 17,378 (95.91%)
Gypsies: 353 (1.95%)
Germans: 199 (1.10%)
Others and indefinable: 190 (1.05%)
Approx. 2,000 persons in Kisbér District did not declare their ethnic group at the 2011 census.

Religion
Religious adherence in the county according to 2011 census:

Catholic – 9,058 (Roman Catholic – 9,010; Greek Catholic – 47);
Reformed – 3,145;
Evangelical – 1,013; 
other religions – 190; 
Non-religious – 1,649; 
Atheism – 119;
Undeclared – 5,110.

See also
List of cities and towns in Hungary

References

External links
 Postal codes of the Kisbér District

Districts in Komárom-Esztergom County